Siyabuswa is a town (also informally defined as a township) in the countryside of the South African province of Mpumalanga (a region formerly called Eastern Transvaal). During the apartheid era, Siyabuswa was the capital of the KwaNdebele Bantustan. It served as a capital from 1981 to 1986 when KwaMhlanga replaced it. Most of its inhabitants (population in 2011: 36 882) are members of the Ndebele ethnic group. Currently Siyabuswa is home to several ethnic groups, namely the Ndebele, Pedi and Sotho people.

Transport 
The town is about 20 kilometers southwest of the Marble Hall airport. The R573 regional route (also known as the Moloto road) that links Pretoria with the N11 national road at Marble Hall, passes through Siyabuswa.

See also
 KwaMhlanga
 Moloto, falling under Gauteng.
 Marble Hall
 Vaalbank

References

Populated places in the Dr JS Moroka Local Municipality